Stuart Senior (born 26 October 1953) in Barnsley is an English former footballer who played for Barnsley.

References

English footballers
Barnsley F.C. players
Kiveton Park F.C. players
English Football League players
Footballers from Barnsley
1953 births
Living people
Association football wingers